Alex (Alexander) Feneridis is a New Zealand football player of Greek extraction who plays for Team Wellington.

Alex Feneridis is the son of businessman and horse breeder Costa Feneridis, who in turn is a grandson of Arcady (Arcadios) Feneridis, New Zealand Chess Champion in 1957. Alex has a younger sister, former Auckland schoolgirls tennis champion Danielle Feneridis.

Feneridis started his career with Auckland City, playing there for eight years.
In September 2014, Feneridis opted to leave Auckland City and join Team Wellington.

International career
He was also in the New Zealand Olympic team in London 2012 and made an appearance against Egypt.

Honours 

 Auckland City FC

 OFC Champions League (5): 2008–09, 2010–11, 2011–12, 2012–13, 2013–14
 New Zealand Football Championship Premiers (3): 2009–10, 2011–12, 2013–14
 New Zealand Football Championship Champions (2): 2009, 2014
 Charity Cup (2): 2011, 2013

 Team Wellington

 Charity Cup: 2014
 New Zealand Football Championship Champions: 2016

References

Living people
1989 births
Association footballers from Wellington City
New Zealand association footballers
Olympic association footballers of New Zealand
Footballers at the 2012 Summer Olympics
Auckland City FC players
Team Wellington players
New Zealand people of Greek descent
Association football midfielders